is a dialectic allegory written by Kūkai in 797. It is Japan's oldest comparative ideological critique.

At the time of writing, Kūkai was 24 years old. It is his debut work.

Contents

The text is three volumes in length. It is written in a dialectic style comparing and critiquing Confucianism, Taoism, and Buddhism. Teachers from each school of thought attempt to educate a dissolute nephew Tokaku. In volume one, Kibō lectures on Confucianism. In volume two, Kyobō Inji critiques Confucianism from a Taoism position. Finally, in volume three, Kamei Kotsuji critiques Taoism from a Buddhist position. The conclusion is that Buddhism is the superior philosophy.

Characters

The main characters appearing within the text were based on actual people:
Kamei Kotsuji: Kūkai himself
Tokaku: 
Kibō: 
Kyobō: unclear but seems to be based on Sima Xiangru

References

 
 
 

Late Old Japanese texts
Allegory
Mahayana texts
Shingon Buddhism
8th-century Japanese books
Books about Buddhism in the Heian period
Kūkai
Three teachings
Kanbun